Posyolok Opytnoy Stantsii VNIIK is a rural locality (a settlement) in Petinskoye Rural Settlement, Khokholsky District, Voronezh Oblast, Russia. The population was 977 as of 2010. There are 31 streets.

Geography 
It is located 24 km of from Khokholsky (the district's administrative centre) by road. Orlovka is the nearest rural locality.

References 

Rural localities in Khokholsky District